Caio Pizzoli is a Brazilian ten-pin bowler. He finished 21st in the combined rankings at the 2006 AMF World Cup.

References

Living people
Year of birth missing (living people)
Brazilian ten-pin bowling players
Brazilian people of Italian descent
Place of birth missing (living people)